Pēteris "Peter" Skudra (born April 24, 1973) is a Latvian former professional ice hockey goaltender and head coach. During a playing career that lasted from 1994 to 2007 he played for several teams in Latvia, Russia and North America. After starting his career in Latvia, Skudra moved to the North American minor leagues in 1994. He signed with the Pittsburgh Penguins of the National Hockey League (NHL) in 1997 and made his debut that year. Over the next six seasons Skudra played for the Penguins, Buffalo Sabres, Boston Bruins, and Vancouver Canucks. In 2003 he moved to Russia, playing the last four seasons of his career. Playing in the NHL primarily as a back-up goalie, Skudra appeared in 146 games during his career.

Playing career
Originally signed as a free agent by Pittsburgh in 1997, Skudra went on to play 74 games with the Penguins over three years. After the 1999–2000 season, he was signed by the Boston Bruins. After playing for the Bruins in 2000–01 season, he was signed by the Vancouver Canucks as a backup to Dan Cloutier. Towards the end of the 2002–03 season, Skudra fell out of favor with coach Marc Crawford who instead decided to have Alex Auld backup Dan Cloutier for that season's playoffs.

In 2003, Skudra left North America for the Russian League, where he played for Ak Bars Kazan, Khimik Moscow Oblast, CSKA Moscow, and Metallurg Novokuznetsk. On October 22, 2007, Skudra announced his retirement after 13 professional seasons.

Coaching career
In April 2013 Skudra was announced as the new head coach of Russian club, Torpedo Nizhniy Novgorod of the KHL. He spent five seasons with the team. He also briefly coached Traktor Chelyabinsk in 2019.

On 20 July, 2020, Skudra was introduced in a dual general manager and head coaching role with Latvian KHL club, Dinamo Riga.

Roller hockey 
Skudra also played one season in the Roller Hockey International league for the Oklahoma Coyotes.

Career statistics

Regular season and playoffs

International

References

External links

1973 births
Living people
Ak Bars Kazan players
Boston Bruins players
Buffalo Sabres players
Erie Panthers players
Expatriate ice hockey players in Russia
Greensboro Monarchs players
Hamilton Bulldogs (AHL) players
Hartford Wolf Pack players
HC CSKA Moscow players
HC Khimik Voskresensk players
Metallurg Novokuznetsk players
Houston Aeros (1994–2013) players
Johnstown Chiefs players
Kansas City Blades players
Latvian ice hockey goaltenders
Manitoba Moose players
Memphis RiverKings players
Oklahoma Coyotes players
Pittsburgh Penguins players
Providence Bruins players
Rochester Americans players
Soviet ice hockey players
Ice hockey people from Riga
Undrafted National Hockey League players
Vancouver Canucks players
Latvian ice hockey coaches
Expatriate ice hockey players in the United States
Latvian expatriate ice hockey people
Expatriate ice hockey players in Canada
Latvian expatriate sportspeople in Russia
Latvian expatriate sportspeople in the United States
Latvian expatriate sportspeople in Canada
Soviet ice hockey goaltenders